Meenachullion is a blanket bog, Ramsar site and national nature reserve of approximately  in County Donegal.

Features
Meenachullion was legally protected as a national nature reserve by the Irish government in 1990. In 1990, the site was also declared Ramsar site number 475.

Meenachullion is a lowland blanket bog, with vegetation that transitions into fen and wet grassy heath as it meets the slopes of Gubben Hill. On the flat top of the Hill there are small, eroded areas of highland blanket bog. The reserve also includes a part of the headwaters of a Gweebarra River tributary. A number of bird species use the reserve as a breeding site, and a small flock of Anser albifrons flavirostris overwinter on the reserve.

References

Bogs of the Republic of Ireland
Landforms of County Donegal
Protected areas of County Donegal
Tourist attractions in County Donegal
Nature reserves in the Republic of Ireland
Protected areas established in 1990
1990 establishments in Ireland
Ramsar sites in the Republic of Ireland